Alpinetin is a phytochemical isolated from a variety of plants including those of the genus Alpinia.  It is going through tests to see if it is a vasorelaxant.

References

External links 
chemblink page
ChemSub Online: Alpinetin.

Flavanones